East Coker is a location in Somerset, England. 

East Coker may also refer to:

East Coker (poem), a poem by T.S. Eliot
"East Coker", a song by the American band Bright from the album The Miller Fantasies